The Australian Aviation Museum was located on Starkie Drive, Bankstown Airport in the suburb of Bankstown.

History

The Museum was opened by the then Prime Minister the Hon. Paul Keating in 1994, and showcases the history and future of aviation, space technology and the progress in world aviation. The Museum is now closed permanently.

Collection 
The Australian Aviation Museum has on display a mock up Boeing 747-400 which is used as a Movie set. It has been used in films such as Mission: Impossible 2, the Lost (TV series), Foxtel's the Pam Ann Show and many other productions. The Movie Set has a detailed Cockpit with Galleys, First, Business and Economy Seats.

The Museum boasts the world's only Fawcett 120 which was manufactured at Bankstown,

 Luton Major, 
 1931 Clancy Skybaby,  
 Harley Newman Gyrocopter which has never been flown.
 Historic Uniforms and Flying Apparel,

Notable aircraft in collection

 Beechcraft Model 35 V Tail Bonanza
 Clancy Skybaby
 Corby Starlet
 Dassault Mirage III
 Douglas DC-3
 Fawcett 120
 Feast Circle CW Aircraft
 Harley Newman Gyrocopter AUSTRALIA II
 Link Trainer
 Luton L.A.5 Major
 Mayfly 3 Pedal Powered Aircraft
 Mikoyan-Gurevich MIG-15 UTI
 Hawker Siddeley HS 748
 de Havilland Dove (Sea Devon C Mk.20)
 de Havilland Drover
 de Havilland Heron
 Royal Aircraft Factory S.E.5a Replica
 Scottish Aviation Twin Pioneer
 Short C Class Empire Model
 Transavia PL-12 Airtruk
 Volmer VJ-22 Sportsman
 Wheeler Tweetie Hang Glider
 Wheeler Skycraft Scout

See also
List of aerospace museums

References

External links 
 Australian Aviation Museum, Bankstown

Transport museums in New South Wales
Aerospace museums in Australia
Aviation in New South Wales
1994 establishments in Australia
 Museums established in 1994